The 1984 Donnay Indoor Championships was a men's tennis tournament played on indoor carpet courts in Brussels in Belgium the event was part of the 1984 Volvo Grand Prix. It was the fourth edition of the tournament and was held from 5 March until 11 March 1984. Second-seeded John McEnroe won the singles title.

Finals

Singles

 John McEnroe defeated  Ivan Lendl, 6–1, 6–3
 It was McEnroe's 4th singles title of the year and the 50th of his career.

Doubles

 Tim Gullikson /  Tom Gullikson defeated  Kevin Curren /  Steve Denton, 6–4, 6–7, 7–6

See also
 Lendl–McEnroe rivalry

References

External links
 ITF tournament edition details

Donnay Indoor Championships
Donnay
+